An  (also  and ) is an educational school that offers education from elementary or middle (or even from the kindergarten) until university. Escalator schools are so called because students usually rise to the next grade without having to take entrance exams. While many Western private schools are this way, escalator schools are far more prevalent in Japan and in the Philippines than in other countries.

Escalator schools are commonly found in anime and manga, as they are a quick and easy explanation for having characters of very different ages in the same school-like setting realistically.

Examples in pop culture

 Ohtori Academy in Revolutionary Girl Utena.

 CLAMP Academy in CLAMP School Detectives.

 Mugen Gakuen and T*A Private Girls School in Sailor Moon.

 Mahora Academy in Mahou Sensei Negima.

 Ouran Academy in Ouran High School Host Club.

 Saki Girls' School in Joshi Kousei.

 Eitoku Academy in Boys Before Flowers.

 Xavier's School for Gifted Youngsters/Xavier Academy in the comic book, cartoon and theatrical versions of the X-Men. Xavier's "escalator" goes one step higher, since most of the instructors are former students who seamlessly moved into their new roles.

 Sayaka Kudo's high school in Flying Colors (2015 film).

See also
 All-through school
 Dual degree
 Educational stage
 K–12

References

School types